Ophiomorpha is an ichnotaxon, usually interpreted as a burrow of an organism (specifically a crustacean) living in the near-shore environment. The burrow lining is more or less smooth on the inside, and densely to strongly mammalated or nodose on the outside, due to the packing of fecal pellets for support of the burrow. Branching is irregular but Y-shaped where present.  It (particularly O. nodosa) is often considered part of the Skolithos ichnofacies, where it has occurred (i.e. nearshore environments) since the early Permian, though it (particularly O. rudis) has also occurred in deep water settings (Nereites ichnofacies) since the Late Jurassic, such as well-oxygenated turbidites.

More generally Ophiomorpha and other crustacean-generated burrows first become prominent in the Jurassic.

See also 
 Trace fossil
 Ichnology

References 

Burrow fossils